Diclidanthera is a genus of flowering plants belonging to the family Polygalaceae.

Its native range is Venezuela to Brazil and Northern Peru.

Species:

Diclidanthera bolivarensis 
Diclidanthera elliptica 
Diclidanthera laurifolia 
Diclidanthera octandra 
Diclidanthera penduliflora 
Diclidanthera wurdackiana

References

Polygalaceae
Fabales genera